David Moody was born in 19 November, 1970. He is an English horror writer. He first came to public attention with his book Autumn, published freely on-line in 2001. Autumn was made into a motion picture starring David Carradine and Dexter Fletcher which was released in 2009. Film rights to Moody's Hater trilogy were picked up in 2008 by Universal Pictures, with Mark Johnson and Guillermo del Toro to produce and Juan Antonio Bayona to direct.

Bibliography

Autumn
Autumn (2001 - republished 2010)
Autumn: The City (2003 - republished 2011)
Autumn: Purification (2004 - republished 2011)
Autumn: The Human Condition (2005 - republished 2013)
Autumn: Disintegration (2011)
Autumn: Aftermath (2012)
Autumn: Dawn (2021 - book one of the London trilogy)
Autumn: Inferno (2022 - book two of the London trilogy)
Autumn: Exodus (2023 - book three of the London trilogy)

Hater
Hater (2006)
Dog Blood (2010)
Them or Us (2011)
One of Us Will Be Dead by Morning (2017)
All Roads End Here (2019)
Chokehold (2019)

Other works
Straight to You (1996 - republished 2014)
Trust (2005 - republished 2012)
Joe & Me (2012)
The Cost of Living (2014)
Isolation (2014)
Last of the Living (2014)
Strangers (2014)
The Front: Red Devils (2017)
The Last Big Thing (2019)

References

External links

Official Autumn website - http://www.lastoftheliving.net/
Story behind Autumn - Online Essay by David Moody

1970 births
Living people
English horror writers
People from Dudley
English male novelists